Melatonin receptors are G protein-coupled receptors (GPCR) which bind melatonin. Three types of melatonin receptors have been cloned. The MT1 (or Mel1A or MTNR1A) and MT2 (or Mel1B or MTNR1B) receptor subtypes are present in humans and other mammals, while an additional melatonin receptor subtype MT3 (or Mel1C or MTNR1C) has been identified in amphibia and birds. The receptors are crucial in the signal cascade of melatonin. In the field of chronobiology, melatonin has been found to be a key player in the synchrony of biological clocks. Melatonin secretion by the pineal gland has circadian rhythmicity regulated by the suprachiasmatic nucleus (SCN) found in the brain. The SCN functions as the timing regulator for melatonin; melatonin then follows a feedback loop to decrease SCN neuronal firing. The receptors MT1  and MT2 control this process. Melatonin receptors are found throughout the body in places such as the brain, the retina of the eye, the cardiovascular system, the liver and gallbladder, the colon, the skin, the kidneys, and many others. In 2019, X-ray crystal and cryo-EM structures of MT1 and MT2 were reported.

History 

Melatonin has been known about since the beginning of the 20th century with experiments led by Carey P. McCord and Floyd P. Allen. The two scientists obtained extracts of the pineal gland from bovines and noticed its blanching effects on the skin of tadpoles. The melatonin chemical was found and isolated in the pineal gland in 1958 by physician Aaron B. Lerner. Due to its ability to lighten skin, Lerner named the compound melatonin. Discovery of high affinity binding sites for melatonin were found near the end of the 20th century. The experiment to find these binding sites utilized an expression cloning strategy to isolate the site. The receptor was first cloned from the melanophores of Xenopus laevis. In recent years, research with melatonin has shown to improve neurological disorders such as Parkinson's, Alzheimer's disease, brain edema, and traumatic brain injury, alcoholism, and depression. Also, regulation of addictive behavior has been associated with the increase of melatonin receptor-related cAMP in the mesolimbic dopaminergic system. Melatonin treatment has also been studied as a remedy of disturbed circadian rhythms found in conditions such a jet lag, shift work, and types of insomnia.

Function and regulation

General
Melatonin serves a variety of functions throughout the body. While its role in sleep promotion is its most well known, melatonin has its hands in a wide range of biological processes. In addition to sleep promotion, melatonin also regulates hormone secretion, rhythms in reproductive activity, immune functionality, and circadian rhythms. Further, melatonin functions as a neuroprotective, pain-reducer, tumor suppressor, reproduction stimulant, and antioxidant. Melatonin has an anti-excitatory effect on brain activity which is exemplified by its reduction of epileptic activity in children which is to say that it is an inhibitory transmitter. The functional diversity of the melatonin receptors contribute to the range of influence that melatonin has over various biological processes. Some of the functions/effects of melatonin binding to its receptor have been linked to one of the specific versions of the receptor that has been discriminated (MT1, MT2,  MT3). The expression patterns in melatonin receptors are unique and brain area specific. In mammals, melatonin receptors are found in the brain and some peripheral organs. However, there is considerable variation in the density and location of MT receptor expression between species, and the receptors show different affinities for different ligands.

MT1
The sleep promoting effects of melatonin has been tied to the activation of the MT1 receptor in the suprachiasmatic nucleus (SCN) which has an inhibitory effect on brain activity. While the phase shifting activity of melatonin has largely been linked to the MT2 receptor, there is evidence to suggest that the MT1 receptor plays a role in the process of entrainment to light-dark cycles. This evidence comes from an experiment in which wild-type (WT) mice and MT1 knock-out (KO) mice were given melatonin and their rates of entrainment were observed. Entrainment was observed to accelerate in WT mice upon melatonin dosage but not in MT1 KO mice which lead to the conclusion that MT1 plays a role in phase-shifting activity.

Expression PatternsThe MT1 melatonin receptor sits on the cell membrane. In humans it consists of 351 amino acids that are encoded in chromosome 4. Its main function here is as an adenylate cyclase inhibitor, which works when MT1 binds to other G-proteins. In humans, The MT1 subtype is expressed in the pars tuberalis of the pituitary gland, the retina, and the suprachiasmatic nuclei of the hypothalamus, and are most likely found in human skin. As humans age, the expression of MT1 and the SCN decreases because MT1 reaction rate decreases and prolactin secretion decreases.

MT2 
The MT2 receptor has been shown to serve several functions in the body. In humans, the MT2 subtype's expression in the retina is suggestive of melatonin's effect on the mammalian retina occurring through this receptor. Research suggests that melatonin acts to inhibit the Ca2+-dependent release of dopamine. Melatonin's action in the retina is believed to affect several light-dependent functions, including phagocytosis and photopigment disc shedding. In addition to retina this receptor is expressed on the osteoblasts and is increased upon their differentiation. MT2 regulates proliferation and differentiation of osteoblasts and regulates their function in depositing bone.
MT2 signaling seems  also involved in the pathogenesis of type 2 diabetes. Activation of the MT2 receptor promotes vasodilation which lowers body temperature in the extremities upon daytime administration. The most notable of the functions that are largely mediated by the MT2 receptor is that of phase shifting the internal circadian clock to entrain to the Earth's natural light-dark cycle. As noted above, the MT1 receptor has been shown to have a hand in phase shifting but this role is secondary to that of the MT2 receptor. In experiments involving MT1 KO mice (and WT as a control) both WT and MT1 KO groups exhibited phase shifting activity. On the flip side, MT2 KO mice were not able to phase shift suggesting that the MT2 receptor is necessary for phase shifting the internal circadian clock.

Expression Patterns The MT2 (cell membrane) subtype is expressed in the retina, and are also found in skin; MT2 receptor mRNA has not been detected by in situ hybridization in the rat suprachiasmatic nucleus or pars tuberalis. The MT2 receptor is found in chromosome four, of humans, and consists of 351 amino acids. Recently, scientists have been studying the relationship between the MT2 receptor and sleep disorders, anxiety, depression, and pain. Since it was found that MT2 receptors contribute to sleep regulation, through NREMS, and has anxiety reducing effects, scientists have begun to consider MT2 as a treatment target for the aforementioned afflictions.

MT3 
While MT3 has been briefly described in its potential role of regulating fluid pressure inside the eye, it does not carry the same relevance to critical biological process such as sleep promotion, locomotor activity, and circadian rhythm regulation that MT1 and MT2 do. MT3 also serves a detoxification role in liver, heart, intestine, kidney, muscle and fat.

Expression Patterns The MT3 subtype of many non-mammalian vertebrates is expressed in various brain areas. MT3 is also known as a reductase detoxification enzyme (quinone reductase 2). The enzyme finds its home largely in the "liver, kidney, heart, lung, intestine, muscle and brown fat tissue".... and there is significant research that supports the claim that MT3 helps regulate the pressure that develops on the inside of the eye.

Melatonin binding 
The melatonin receptors MT1 and MT2 are G-protein coupled receptors (GPCRs) that typically adhere to the cell's surface so that they can receive external melatonin signals. Binding of melatonin to the MT1 receptor leads to inhibition of cAMP production and Protein Kinase A (PKA). While activation of the MT2 receptor is also shown to inhibit the production of cAMP, it additionally inhibits cGMP production. Melatonin binding to the MT1 and MT2 receptors is only one of the paths through which it shows its influence. In addition to binding to membrane bound GPCRs (MT1 and MT2) melatonin also binds to intracellular and nuclear receptors.

Regulation of melatonin receptors 
The different types of melatonin receptors are regulated in different ways. When the MT1 receptor is exposed to typical levels of melatonin, there is no change in cell membrane receptor density, affinity for substrate, or functional sensitivity. However, the same trend is not shown in MT2 receptors. Administration of typical levels of melatonin resulted in the removal of MT2 receptors from the membrane (internalization) and a decrease in the sensitivity of the receptor to melatonin. These responses help the MT2 receptor accomplish its role in phase shifting the circadian clock by adjusting the sensitivity and availability of the population of MT2 to melatonin. This desensitization and/or internalization is characteristic of many GPCRs. Often, binding of melatonin to MT2 and subsequent desensitization can lead to the internalization of that receptor which decreases the availability of membrane bound melatonin receptor which will prevent additional melatonin from having as robust of an effect as the initial application. Since there are regular rhythms in both of these receptor subtypes, the internalization and resulting decrease in receptor availability following administration of typical levels of melatonin will effectively shift the phase of this rhythm in MT2. The behavior of each of these receptors under prolonged exposure to their chief agonist - melatonin - is indicative of the functions that they are each crucial to.

Role in circadian rhythms 
Since the SCN is responsible for mediating the production of melatonin by the pineal gland, it creates a feedback loop that regulates the production of melatonin according to the master circadian clock. As was discussed previously, the MT1 receptor is largely thought of as the major player in sleep-promotion and the MT2 receptor is most strongly linked to phase shifting activity. Both major subtypes of the melatonin receptor are expressed in relatively large amounts in the SCN which allow it to both regulate sleep-wake cycles and induce phase shifting in response to natural light-dark cycles. This functional diversity of melatonin receptors helps give the SCN the ability to not only keep near 24-hour time and entrain to an exactly 24-hour period, but also regulate, among other factors, wakefulness and activity throughout this cycle.

Dysfunction and supplemental melatonin 
Melatonin's role as a hormone in the body is its most widely known and the primary target of supplemental melatonin. Many people who struggle with falling asleep utilize melatonin supplements to help induce the onset of their sleep. However, melatonin's influence on the body extends much further than simple sleep promotion. Melatonin has also been described as a "cellular protector". Studies have found that higher circadian levels of melatonin correspond to lower rates of breast cancer while abnormally low serum melatonin levels can increase a woman's chance of developing breast cancer. Irregular/arrhythmic melatonin levels has, in addition to cancer, been linked to development of cardiovascular disease.

Selective ligands

Agonists
 6-Hydroxymelatonin
 Agomelatine
 GR-196,429
 Melatonin
 N-Acetylserotonin
 Piromelatine 
 Ramelteon
 Tasimelteon

Antagonists
 Afobazole
 Luzindole
 Prazosin

See also 
Discovery and development of melatonin receptor agonists

References

External links 
 
 

Receptor